Štadión MŠK is a multi-use stadium in Považská Bystrica, Slovakia.  It is currently used mostly for football matches and is the home ground of MŠK Považská Bystrica.  The stadium is now in reconstruction since 2021. New capacity will be 2,200 – 2,300.

References

Multi-purpose stadiums in Slovakia
Buildings and structures in Trenčín Region
Sport in Trenčín Region